The United States Post Office and Court House in Cheyenne, Wyoming, also called the Joseph C. O'Mahoney Federal Center, was listed on the National Register of Historic Places in 2017.

It is a four-story building.

References

Courthouses in Wyoming
Post office buildings in Wyoming
National Register of Historic Places in Hot Springs County, Wyoming
Neoclassical architecture in Wyoming
Buildings and structures completed in 1933